Vi tänder ett ljus i advent is an Advent song, written by Stewe Gårdare.

Recordings
An early recording was done by Voice on the 1984 album Jul i vårt hus.

Publication
Julens önskesångbok, 1997, under the lines "Advent".
Number 810 in Psalmer och Sånger 2003 under the lines "Advent".

References

Advent songs
Swedish songs
Swedish-language songs